Emmett Swanson (February 17, 1906 – December 10, 1968) was an American sports shooter. He competed at the 1948 Summer Olympics and 1952 Summer Olympics. He served as president of the National Rifle Association in 1948.

References

1906 births
1968 deaths
American male sport shooters
Olympic shooters of the United States
Shooters at the 1948 Summer Olympics
Shooters at the 1952 Summer Olympics
Sportspeople from Minneapolis
Presidents of the National Rifle Association
Pan American Games medalists in shooting
Pan American Games gold medalists for the United States
Pan American Games bronze medalists for the United States
Shooters at the 1959 Pan American Games